Ryan Lee West, known by his stage name Rival Consoles, is a British electronic musician, living in London. All of his albums and EPs have been released by Erased Tapes Records.

Biography
West was born in Leicester. He learned to play guitar in his youth, but later switched to electronic production, studying music technology at De Montfort University. He initially used the stage name Aparatec, releasing an EP of material under that name in 2007. His first release as Rival Consoles was issued later in 2007 by Erased Tapes Records, which has released all of his albums and EPs.

West has remixed tracks by Jon Hopkins, Vessels, Ólafur Arnalds, Nils Frahm, Max Cooper, Noisia, Sasha and Toydrum.

Rival Consoles' style is a combination of ambient, shoegaze, minimal techno and cinematic—often created with analogue synths, pedals and degraded processes. Pitchfork described Rival Consoles' sound as "high-brow, avant-garde electronic music in the vein of Jon Hopkins and Nils Frahm".

West has also scored work for contemporary dance such as Alexander Whitley's Overflow and has scored an episode of Netflix's Black Mirror ("Striking Vipers"). His track "Recovery" was used in a 2020 television commercial for Blue Dragon foods.

Discography

Studio albums

Solo 
IO (2009, Erased Tapes)
Kid Velo (2011, Erased Tapes)
Howl (2015, Erased Tapes)
Night Melody (2016, Erased Tapes) – mini-album
Persona (2018, Erased Tapes)
Articulation (2020, Erased Tapes)
Overflow (2021, Erased Tapes)
Now Is (2022, Erased Tapes)

With other musicians 
65/Milo (2009, with Kiasmos)

EPs 
The Decadent (2007, Erased Tapes)
Vemeer EP (2007, Erased Tapes, as Aparatec)
Helvetica (2009, Erased Tapes)
Odyssey (2014, Erased Tapes)
Sonne (2015, Erased Tapes)
Odyssey/Sonne (2015, Erased Tapes)

Remixes 
 Four - Olafur Arnalds, Nils Frahm - Rival Consoles Remix
 Distant Light - Max Cooper - Rival Consoles Remix 
 Cassette sessions E - Sasha - Rival Consoles Remix
 The Approach - Noisia - Rival Consoles Remix
 Jesus Song - Toydrum - Rival Consoles Remix 
 Weightless - Neil Cowley Trio - Rival Consoles Remix 
 Swim - Douglas Dare - Rival Consoles Remix
 Birds That Fly - Kidnap - Rival Consoles Remix

References

Living people
1985 births
People from Leicester
English electronic musicians
Erased Tapes Records artists